Darren McCauley (born 29 November 1991) is an Irish footballer, who plays for Essendon Royals in Australia.

Club career
McCauley spent his youth career with local club Top of the Hill Celtic before joining the Derry City academy. He made his Derry City debut in 2009 aged 17. After numerous trials with cross channel clubs, Motherwell FC and Blackburn Rovers FC offered professional contracts but could not come to a compensation deal with Derry City who were going into financial liquidation at the time. He then joined Celtic FC in a loan deal. Upon his return from Celtic he signed back with Derry City and would go on to win the First Division. He then had spells with Irish League clubs Coleraine FC and Institute FC. At Coleraine he won the 2018 Irish Cup and scored the first European goal in 20 years against Spartak Subotica in the Europa League. In 2018 McCauley embraced teetotalism and experienced an improvement in his football career. He signed for Scottish Championship club Inverness Caledonian Thistle in January 2019. He scored on his 3rd appearance for Inverness, in a 2–1 loss to Partick Thistle. He signed again for Derry City before joining Australian side Essendon Royals in 2020.

International career
He was previously a member of the Northern Ireland Under-18 Schools' team that won the tri-nation Schools' tournament in Jersey in February 2009.

He also captained the under 18 schoolboys to victory in the Carnegie Centenary Shield match against England in March 2009.

McCauley was also a member of the Republic of Ireland Under 19 squad.

Career Statistics

References

External links
Player Information ifapremiership.com
Statistics at playerhistory.com
Statistics at soccer-talents.com

1991 births
Association footballers from Northern Ireland
Derry City F.C. players
Association football forwards
League of Ireland players
Living people
Republic of Ireland association footballers
Institute F.C. players
Republic of Ireland youth international footballers
Coleraine F.C. players
NIFL Premiership players
Association football wingers
Inverness Caledonian Thistle F.C. players
Scottish Professional Football League players
Sportspeople from Derry (city)